The following is a list of Union Army units from the District of Columbia during the American Civil War. A total of 15,131 men fought in two regiments and four battalions of infantry and one regiment of cavalry. Other independent companies were raised during the war for local defense, including 33 companies of infantry and one company of cavalry raised from the District militia from April to July 1861.

See also 
 Washington, D.C. in the American Civil War
 List of American Civil War units by state

References

Bibliography 
 Dyer, Frederick H. (1959). A Compendium of the War of the Rebellion. New York and London. Thomas Yoseloff, Publisher. .

 
District of Columbia Civil War regiments, List of